Casalnuovo Monterotaro is a town and comune in the province of Foggia in the Apulia region of southeast Italy. The town is located in the Monti Dauni. It  was historically an  Arbëreshë settlement, the inhabitants however no longer use the Albanian language.

References

External links
 https://web.archive.org/web/20170707183655/http://www.casalnuovomonterotaro.net/

Cities and towns in Apulia